Deng Fei is a fictional character in Water Margin, one of the Four Great Classical Novels of Chinese literature. Nicknamed "Fiery Eyed Suan-ni", he ranks 49th among the 108 Stars of Destiny and 13th among the 72 Earthly Fiends.

Background
Deng Fei, a native of Xiangyang, is one of the three bandit chiefs at Yinma River (飲馬川; in present-day Ji County, Tianjin), ranked below Pei Xuan and above Meng Kang.  Deng Fei, who is nicknamed "Fiery Eyed Suan-ni" due to his blood-shot eyes, fights with a long iron chain.

Joining Liangshan
Dai Zong has incidentally come to know Yang Lin when he tries to locate Gongsun Sheng, who has returned to his hometown of Jizhou to visit his mother, to get him back to Liangshan as instructed by Song Jiang. The two pass by Yinma River (飲馬川; in present-day Ji County, Tianjin) and are blocked by a bandit group led by Deng Fei and Meng Kang. It turns out that Yang and Deng are acquaintances. They are introduced to the chief Pei Xuan, who agrees to merge his band into that of Liangshan.

Campaigns and death
Deng Fei is appointed as one of the leaders of the Liangshan cavalry after the 108 Stars of Destiny came together in what is called the Grand Assembly.  He participates in their campaigns against the Liao invaders and rebel forces in Song territory following amnesty from Emperor Huizong for Liangshan.

Before the attack headed by Lu Junyi on Dusong Pass (獨松關; located south of present-day Anji County, Zhejiang) in the campaign against Fang La, a small team is sent to spy on the terrain led by Deng Fei, Ou Peng, Li Zhong and Zhou Tong. While they are studying the landscape, the gate of the pass suddenly opens, out of which charges a group of attackers on horseback. Zhou Tong, taken by surprise, is killed while Deng Fei and the others barely get away. The Liangshan force later overruns Dusong Pass.

Lu Junyi's army later merges with Song Jiang's for a combined attack on Hangzhou. Deng Fei, Suo Chao and others are assigned to take the north gate. When Suo Chao is slain by the enemy warrior Shi Bao, Deng is eager to avenge him. But he too is killed, being sliced in two by Shi.

References
 
 
 
 
 
 
 

72 Earthly Fiends
Fictional characters from Hubei